Deccan 360 also known as Deccan Cargo & Express Logistics was a cargo airline based in Bangalore, India.

History
Deccan 360 began operations in November 2009, the company was set up by Capt. G.R. Gopinath, former owner of Air Deccan, which he sold to Kingfisher Airlines. Deccan 360 began with three Airbus A310 cargo planes and five ATR cargo aircraft but the Airbuses had maintenance issues and were often grounded. Deccan returned these planes to the lessor in May 2011. and suspended operations in the same month.
Renamed as Deccan Cargo and Express Logistics Pvt. Ltd.(DCEL) in 2007–2008, has been ordered to wind up by the Karnataka High Court in a recent order based on petitions — one filed by Dubai-based United Aviation Services (UAS) and another by M/s Patel Integrated Logistics (PIL) Pvt. Ltd. — seeking recovery of amounts due to them by winding up the company.

Destinations
Deccan 360 previously served the following.

Hong Kong International Airport

Ahmedabad - Sardar Vallabhbhai Patel International Airport
Bangalore - Bengaluru International Airport (hub)
Chennai - Chennai International Airport
Cochin - Cochin International Airport
Trivandrum - Trivandrum International Airport
Coimbatore - Coimbatore International Airport
Delhi - Indira Gandhi International Airport
Guwahati - Lokpriya Gopinath Bordoloi International Airport
Belgaum - Belgaum Airport
Hubballi/Dharwad - Hubli Airport
Kolkata - Netaji Subhash Chandra Bose International Airport
Mumbai - Chhatrapati Shivaji International Airport
Nagpur - Dr. Ambedkar International Airport

Dubai - Dubai International Airport

Fleet

Deccan 360 fleet included the following aircraft as of December 2012:

Previous types operated
1 ATR 42-300F 	
3 Airbus A310-300F

References

External links

Official website

Defunct airlines of India
Defunct cargo airlines
Companies based in Bangalore
Airlines established in 2009
Airlines disestablished in 2011
Cargo airlines of India
Indian companies disestablished in 2011
Indian companies established in 2009
2009 establishments in Karnataka